pene terry may refer to:

George Terry (musician) (born 1950), American guitarist
Sir George Terry (police officer) (1921–1995), senior British police officer

See also
Terry George (born 1952), Irish filmmaker
Terry George (entrepreneur) (born 1965), British businessman